The Laboratory for Electromagnetic and Electronic Systems (LEES) at the Massachusetts Institute of Technology (MIT) provides the theoretical basis, and component, circuit and system technologies required to develop advanced electrical energy applications. LEES research areas include electronic circuits, components and systems, power electronics and control, micro and macro electromechanics, electromagnetics, continuum mechanics (the interaction of fields with fluids and other deformable media), high voltage engineering and dielectric physics, manufacturing and process control, and energy economics.

In 2009 the LEES ceased to exist as a separate lab and was administratively merged into the Research Laboratory of Electronics to form its seventh research theme.

References

External links
The LEES official website 
The MIT official website

Massachusetts Institute of Technology